Stade Municipal de Commune II is located in Bamako, Mali. It is used mostly for football and serves as the home stadium of AS Commune II.  The stadium has a capacity of 3,000

Football venues in Mali
Buildings and structures in Bamako